Pol Haru (also Romanized as Pol Harū; also known as Sīāh Gūshī, Seyāh Gūshī, Sīā Gūshī, and Sīāh Kushi) is a village in Qaedrahmat Rural District, Zagheh District, Khorramabad County, Lorestan Province, Iran. At the 2006 census, its population was 308, in 76 families.

References 

Towns and villages in Khorramabad County